Michel Rouquette (born 26 August 1950 in France) is a French retired footballer who last worked as head coach of Al-Gharafa SC in Qatar.

Career

Rouquette started his senior career with RC Épernay Champagne. In 1974, he signed for AS Monaco in the French Ligue 1, where he made one-hundred and thirteen appearances and scored twenty goals. After that, he played for MArtigues and USM Romilly.

References

External links 
 Michel Rouquette: "Bruno was a lover of life" 
 Magentais Michel Rouquette spots future stars of football 
 Michel Rouquette (Sedan): "It will be difficult" 
 Mickey, "relay in the gallery" 
 Soccer .  Michel Rouquette recalls his memories with the FCM

1950 births
French footballers
AS Saint-Étienne players
AS Monaco FC players
Association football forwards
Association football midfielders
Living people